The canton of Besançon-2 is an administrative division of the Doubs department, eastern France. It was created at the French canton reorganisation which came into effect in March 2015. Its seat is in Besançon.

It consists of the following communes:
 
Audeux
Besançon (partly)
Champagney
Champvans-les-Moulins
Chaucenne
École-Valentin
Mazerolles-le-Salin
Noironte
Pelousey
Pirey
Pouilley-les-Vignes
Serre-les-Sapins

References

Cantons of Doubs